LAN-Chile Flight 160 was a Boeing 727-116 on a flight from Buenos Aires, Argentina to Santiago, Chile carrying 8 crew and 52 passengers which crashed during approach to Santiago on April 28, 1969.

Details of flight

Flight 160 took off from Ministro Pistarini International Airport at 23:56 GMT (20:56 local time), but when nearing Santiago the Boeing 727 descended below the minimum height of 2829 feet and kept on descending until it struck the ground in farm land north of Colina, Chile.

Survivors

While the aircraft was damaged beyond repair in the crash, none of the 60 passengers and crew were killed or injured.

Cause
The cause of the accident was excessive concentration by the crew on the indications given by the flight director instrument, which was being incorrectly used on a direct instrument landing system (ILS) approach. The crew did not check other instruments, which showed that the aircraft was descending below its glidepath.

References

Aviation accidents and incidents in 1969
Aviation accidents and incidents in Chile
Accidents and incidents involving the Boeing 727
160
1969 in Chile
April 1969 events in South America
1969 disasters in Chile